is the debut studio album of the character Kirari Tsukishima from the Japanese anime Kirarin Revolution.

Background and release

Mitsuboshi is the debut studio album of the character Kirari Tsukishima from Kirarin Revolution. Aside from containing new original songs, the album compiles songs from her previous singles, "Koi Kana" and "Balalaika."

An Nakahara, the creator of Kirarin Revolution, wrote the lyrics to "Koi Hanabi." The lyrics appear in volume 6 of the manga.

The album was released on February 28, 2007 under the Zetima label. The limited edition featured an alternate cover and a Happy Idol Life Kurikira Card from Kirarin Revolution. The regular edition came with a 16-page photobook as its first press bonus.

Reception

The album debuted at #16 in the Oricon Weekly Albums Chart and charted for 10 weeks.

Track listing

Charts

References

2007 albums
Anime soundtracks
Kirarin Revolution
Hello! Project albums
Television soundtracks